Gamal Abdel Nasser Airbase is a Libyan Air Force (Berber: Adwas Alibyan Ujnna) base, located about 16 km south of Tobruk. It is believed to once have had about 60 or 70 Mirage F.1EDs aircraft assigned.

Prior to 31 March 1970, the airfield was known as Royal Air Force Station El Adem ( after the nearby settlement al Adm), and used by the RAF primarily as a staging post. Before World War II, it had been an Italian Air Force airfield. A number of the former Italian buildings were seen remaining in 2003, during a courtesy visit by former RAF personnel, at which time no military aircraft were evident.

Royal Air Force Station El Adem was the fuel stop for the BOAC aircraft carrying the new Queen Elizabeth II on her flight from Entebbe to London on 7 February 1952. In 1994, the remaining wreckage of Lady Be Good, a US Army Air Force (USAAF) B-24 Liberator heavy bomber that crashed-landed deep in the Libyan desert during WWII in 1943, was brought to the air base by a local Libyan team led by Dr. Fadel Ali Mohammed (tasked with recovering the plane wreck) for storage and safekeeping. The remnants of the aircraft still remain there.

World War II
The airfield was largely reconstructed in 1942 by the Royal Air Force (RAF) and brought into operational use on 12 December 1942. It was used during World War II by the RAF and the United States Army Air Forces during the North African Campaign against Axis forces.

RAF units which used the airfield were:
 No 31 Air Stores Park (8 Mar – 10 Apr 1941);
 HQ No 262 Wing (11–20 Dec 1941);
 HQ No 258 Wing (12–xx Dec 1941, 3–xx Feb 1942);
 No. 2 Squadron RAAF (19–21 Dec 1941, 2–3 Feb 1942, 15–17 Feb 1942);
 No 33 Air Stores Park (23 Dec 1941 – 31 Jan 1942);
 No 53 Repair and Salvage Unit (26 Dec 1941 – Feb 1942);
 No. 80 Squadron RAF (28 Dec 1941 – 3 Feb 1942);
 Air Sea Rescue Flt (10–31 Jan 1942);
 No. 73 Squadron RAF (3–18 Feb 1942, 20–27 May 1942, 17–28 Nov 1942);
 No. 94 Squadron RAF (15–17 Feb 1942);
 HQ No 211 Group (12 Mar – xxx 1942)
 No 211 Group Communications Flt (20 Apr 1942 – 17 Sep 1943)
 No. 267 Squadron RAF (Aug 1942 – Jan 1943)
 HQ No 243 Wing (17–xx Nov 1942)
 No. 33 Squadron RAF (18–28 Nov 1942)
 No. 117 Squadron RAF (19 Nov 1942 – 9 Jan 1943)
 No. 213 Squadron RAF (20–25 Nov 1942)
 No. 238 Squadron RAF (20–25 Nov 1942)
 No 12 Staging Post (8 Mar 1943 – 1 Aug 1945)
 HQ No 7 (SAAF) Wing (17 Apr – 18 May 1943)
 No 2915 Sqn RAF Regiment (May 1943 – xxx 194x)
 No. 47 Squadron RAF (14–25 Nov 1943)
 HQ No 240 Wing (28 Dec 1943 – 4 Feb 1944)
 No. 178 Squadron RAF (1 Jan – 1 Mar 1944)
 No. 462 Squadron RAF (1 Jan – 15 Feb 1944)
 No. 336 Squadron RAF (31 Jan – 5 Mar 1944, 15 Jul – 16 Sep 1944)
 No 1900 AOP Flt (15 Jan – 1 Jul 1952)
 No. 249 Squadron RAF (11 Mar – 3 May 1957)
 Swifter Trials Flt (Jan–Jul 1960)
 No 1564 Flt (1 May 1969 – 31 Mar 1970)
 No 1 Sqn RAF Regiment

USAAF Ninth Air Force units which used the airfield were:
 316th Troop Carrier Group, 10 December 1942–January 1943, Douglas C-47 Skytrain
 379th Bombardment Squadron, (310th Bombardment Group), 2–26 November 1943, North American B-25 Mitchell
 Attached to No 235 Wing, Royal Air Force

Current use
The airbase is named after the Egyptian revolutionary Gamal Abdel Nasser, who served as President of Egypt. In 2013, the airport was officially reopened as Tobruk International Airport, with flights to Alexandria, Egypt.

References

External links
 Royal Air Force Airfield Creation for the Western Desert Campaign
 RAF El Adem Station Crest

Libyan Air Force bases
Airports in Libya
Airfields of the United States Army Air Forces in Libya
World War II airfields in Libya
Royal Air Force stations of World War II in Africa